Kazuya Murata (村田 和哉, born 7 October 1988) is a Japanese football player.

Career statistics

Club
Updated to end of 2018 season.

1Includes Emperor's Cup.

2Includes J. League Cup.

3Includes AFC Champions League.

References

External links
Profile at Shimizu S-Pulse
Profile at Cerezo Osaka

1988 births
Living people
Osaka University of Health and Sport Sciences alumni
Association football people from Shiga Prefecture
Japanese footballers
J1 League players
J2 League players
Cerezo Osaka players
Shimizu S-Pulse players
Kashiwa Reysol players
Avispa Fukuoka players
Renofa Yamaguchi FC players
Association football forwards